Archelaphe is a genus of snake in the family Colubridae. The genus contains the sole species Archelaphe bella, commonly known as the Burmese rat snake, which is endemic to Asia.

Geographic range
A. bella is found in China, India, Myanmar, and Vietnam.

Description
The dorsal pattern of A. bella resembles that of the North American corn snake (Pantherophis guttatus).

Reproduction
A. bella is oviparous.

Subspecies
Two subspecies are recognized as being valid, including the nominotypical subspecies.
Archelaphe bella bella 
Archelaphe bella chapaensis 

Nota bene: A trinomial authority in parentheses indicates that the subspecies was originally described in a genus other than Archelaphe.

References

Further reading
Bourret RN (1934). "Notes herpétologiques sur l'Indochine Française II. Sur quelques serpents des montagnes du Tonkin ". Bulletin Général de l'Instruction Publique, Hanoi 1934: 149–157. (Elaphe leonardi chapaensis, new subspecies). (in French).
Orlov, Nikolai L.; Ryabov, Sergey A.; Nguyen, Thien Tao; Nguyen, Truong Quang (2010). "Rediscovery and Redescription of Two Rare Snake Species: Oligodon lacroixi Angel et Bourret, 1933 and Maculophis bellus chapaensis (Bourret, 1934) [Squamata: Ophidia: Colubridae] from Fansipan Mountains, Northern Vietnam". Russian Journal of Herpetology 17 (4): 310–322.
Schulz, Klaus-Dieter; Böhme, Wolfgang; Tillack, Frank (2011). "Hemipenis Morphology of Coronella bella Stanley, 1917 with Comments on Taxonomic and Nomenclatural Issues of Ratsnakes (Squamata: Colubridae: Colubrinae: Elaphe auct.)". Russian Journal of Herpetology 18 (4): 273–283. (Archelaphe, new genus).
Smith MA (1943). The Fauna of British India, Ceylon and Burma, Including the Whole of the Indo-Chinese Sub-region. Reptilia and Amphibia. Vol. III.—Serpentes. London: Secretary of State for India. (Taylor and Francis, printers). xii + 583 pp. (Elaphe leonardi, pp. 156–157).
Stanley, Arthur (1917). "Two new species of Chinese snakes". Journal of the North-China Branch Royal Asiatic Society, Shanghai 47: 83–84. (Coronella bella, new species).

Colubrids
Monotypic snake genera
Reptiles of Myanmar
Reptiles of China
Reptiles of Vietnam